The women's shot put event at the 2000 Asian Athletics Championships was held in Jakarta, Indonesia on 30 August.

Results

References

2000 Asian Athletics Championships
Shot put at the Asian Athletics Championships
2000 in women's athletics